United States v. Ninety-Five Barrels Alleged Apple Cider Vinegar, 265 U.S. 438 (1924), was an in rem case in which the Supreme Court of the United States held that apple cider vinegar is mislabeled when that vinegar is made from dried apples. The label at issue indicated that the vinegar was made from "selected" apples. Douglas Packing Company, the manufacturer, admitted to dehydrating fresh apples and then rehydrating the apples with pure water to produce vinegar.

Additional chemicals were used in the manufacturing process for vinegar made from dried apples, but neither party alleged that this affected the vinegar. Other than this and the difference in apples, the manufacturing process was the same. The trial judge, who tried samples of the vinegar at issue and apple cider vinegar made from fresh apples, concluded that there were only slight differences in appearance and taste. Chemical comparison yielded similar results for both liquids.

There was no claim that vinegar from dried apples was of inferior quality. However, the court found first that the dried apple vinegar was not identical to vinegar as commonly understood—that produced from fresh ingredients. Second, fresh apples contain the apple juice that is normally used in the production of apple cider vinegar, whereas Douglas Packing used water as a substitute ingredient. Finally, the court found that "made from selected apples" misled the reader into thinking that the apples were fresh instead of dried. These three issues—an imitation under the same name, false or misleading ingredient listing, and misleading labelling—were all a part of the Pure Food and Drug Act section defining "misbranded". For this reason, the Supreme Court found that the apple cider was misbranded under the statute.

See also 
List of United States Supreme Court cases, volume 265

References

External links
 
 

1924 in United States case law
United States Supreme Court cases
United States Supreme Court cases of the Taft Court
United States statutory interpretation case law
United States in rem cases
Vinegar
Food law
Apple production